Prince of Brazil was the title held by the heir-apparent to the Kingdom of Portugal, from 1645 to 1815. Tied with the title of Prince of Brazil was the title Duke of Braganza and the various subsidiary titles of the Dukedom of Braganza.

The title's name has its origins in the State of Brazil, a colony of the Portuguese Empire. The term "Principality of Brazil" is anachronistic, having never been used as the official title of Brazil in the period in question, in the same way that the "Principality of Beira" related to the nobiliarchic title Prince of Beira never existed. During this period, Brazil was officially designated as the State of Brazil.

The title was abandoned and changed to that of Prince Royal in the wake of Brazil's elevation from the status of a colony to the rank of a Kingdom united with Portugal in the United Kingdom of Portugal, Brazil and the Algarves.

Brazil would later break from the United Kingdom of Portugal, Brazil and the Algarves and become the independent Empire of Brazil. The heirs presumptive of Brazil were known as The Prince Imperial of Brazil or The Princess Imperial of Brazil, with the style of Imperial Highness. Other members of the Brazilian Imperial Family were known by the title of Prince or Princess prefixed to their given names, with the style of Highness. The Portuguese title of Prince of Brazil, that existed as a title of the Portuguese heir apparent only while Brazil was still a colony of Portugal, should therefore not be confused with the later ranks of Brazilian Prince or Brazilian Princess, that stem from the era of the Empire of Brazil.

History
Until the reign of King John IV of Portugal, the heir-apparent to the throne of Portugal had used the title of Prince of Portugal. After his succession to the throne, John IV sought to give his heir a more prestigious and noble title, Prince of Brazil, alongside granting the heir of Portugal the title of Duke of Braganza. The title was created by King John IV of Portugal on 27 October 1645 in favor of his eldest son and heir Teodósio, to replace the title Prince of Portugal. The eldest son and heir of the Prince of Brazil was styled Prince of Beira and Duke of Barcelos.

When Brazil was elevated to the status of a Kingdom within the United Kingdom of Portugal, Brazil and the Algarves, the title was replaced by Prince Royal of the United Kingdom of Portugal, Brazil, and the Algarves. When Brazil broke away from the United Kingdom to become an independent Empire, the title of the Portuguese heir apparent was again changed to Prince Royal of Portugal and the Algarves.

List of Princes of Brazil

External links

 
Heirs to the throne